David John Shearer (16 October 1958 – 3 July 2022) was a Scottish professional footballer who played as a forward. Shearer began his professional football career at his local club, Clachnacuddin in the Scottish Highland Football League. His other professional clubs, all in the English Football League, included Middlesbrough, Scunthorpe United and Gillingham. He made over 230 Football League appearances. He was the older brother of fellow former professional and Highland Football League player Duncan Shearer.

References

1958 births
2022 deaths
AFC Bournemouth players
Darlington F.C. players
Association football forwards
Gillingham F.C. players
Grimsby Town F.C. players
Middlesbrough F.C. players
Footballers from Inverness
Scottish footballers
Scunthorpe United F.C. players
Wigan Athletic F.C. players
Billingham Synthonia F.C. players
English Football League players
Clachnacuddin F.C. players
Highland Football League players